Kakwenza Rukirabashaija (born 1 October 1988) is a Ugandan novelist and lawyer. He is the author of The Greedy Barbarian and Banana Republic: Where Writing is Treasonous. He was named the PEN 2021 Pinter International Writer of Courage Award .

Early life and education 
Kakwenza was born on 1 October 1988 in Rukungiri District, South Western Uganda. He studied at several primary schools in the same district. He attended Kyamakanda Secondary School, Makobore High School and Kigezi College Butobere for O'level. He later joined Muyenga High School in Kampala for A'level. He graduated with a bachelor's degree of Laws from Cavendish University Uganda, degree in development studies from Kyambogo University, a master's degree in journalism from the University of Cape Town,

Marriage 
He is married to Eva Basiima.

Life
On 13 April 2020, Kakwenza was arrested by security operatives from his home in Iganga and detained for publishing his first book The Greedy Barbarian which they believed was about the person of President Yoweri Museveni.

He was arrested again on 18 September 2020 after writing another novel, narrating his ordeal in the hands of his captors. The book is titled Banana Republic: Where Writing is Treasonous.

In February 2021, Kakwenza sued the Government of Uganda for the torture he suffered at the hands of the CMI security operatives.

On 28 December 2021 Ugandan security forces arrested Kakwenza after he had insulted Muhoozi on Twitter calling him obese and ridiculed his military training. The arrest was condemned by opposition leader Bobi Wine and PEN International. On 4 January 2022, a Ugandan court called for his release. He was released for a brief home visit under armed guard that day. He showed visible signs of torture from the Ugandan police, including bloodstains on his clothing, which was removed by Kakwenza and kept by his wife. Pictures of his blood-stained clothing were uploaded to Twitter by Kiiza Eron, a Ugandan human rights lawyer. Although the Judicial courts had retained his passport asserting that the premises for his request to vacate the country were weak, Kakwenza fled Uganda to neighbouring Rwanda in February 2022 fearing for his life. He arrived in Germany on 24 February 2022.

Awards 
2021 PEN Pinter Prize International Writer of Courage

Publications 
The Greedy Barbarian
Banana Republic: Where Writing is Treasonous

References 

Ugandan novelists
1988 births
Living people